Monroe Point may refer to:
Monroe Point, Colonial Beach, Virginia
Monroe Point, South Shetland Islands